was a Japanese voice actress. She was born in the Metropolitan area of Tokyo, Japan. She was affiliated with the voice talent management group 81 Produce at the time of her death.

Later years
During her later life, her work was officially ended due to her poor physical condition.

Death
Akiyama suffered heart failure in her home. She was 59 years old. She was taken to the hospital, where the cause of death was found to be heart failure.

Filmography

Anime
 Zendaman (1979 TV series)
 Time Patrol-Tai Otasukeman (1980 TV series)
 Yattodetaman (1981 TV series)
 Ninja Hattori-kun (1981-1987 TV series), 夢子
 Gyakuten Ippatsu-man (1982 TV series)
 The New Adventures of Honeybee Maya (1982 TV Series), Maya
 The Flying House (1982 TV series), Tsukubō Natsuyama (Corky)
 Itadakiman (1983 TV series)
 Pasocon Travel Tanteidan (1983 TV series), Yuu Asuka (Uri) 
 Ginga Hyōryū Vifam (1983 TV series), Pench
 Attacker You! (1984 TV series), Sunny
 Yoroshiku Mechadock (1984 TV series)
 Soreike! Anpanman (1988 TV series), Milk boy
 Aoi Blink (1989 TV series)
 Asobou! Hello Kitty (1994 TV series), Patty
 Detective Conan (1996 TV series), Megumi (ep 126, 127)
 Ginga Hyōryū Vifam 13 (1998 TV series), Pench Iliza
  (2001 TV series), アーマ
 Ki Fighter Taerang (2002 Korean TV series), Momoa
  (2004 TV series), アーマ
  (2005 TV series), アーマ

Dub
 The Love Boat
 Goosebumps (Tara) (Episode: "The Cuckoo Clock of Doom")

References

External links
 Official agency profile at 81produce 

 
 

1954 births
2014 deaths
81 Produce voice actors
Japanese voice actresses
Voice actresses from Tokyo Metropolis
20th-century Japanese actresses
21st-century Japanese actresses